Qurbanəfəndi (also, Kurbanefeidili, Kurbanefendi, and Kurbanefendili) is a village and municipality in the Ismailli Rayon of Azerbaijan.  It has a population of 1,041.

Notes

References 

Populated places in Ismayilli District